La Revue blanche was a French art and literary magazine run between 1889 and 1903. Some of the greatest writers and artists of the time were its collaborators.

History
The Revue blanche was founded in Liège in 1889 and run by the Natanson brothers (Alexander, Thaddeus and Louis-Alfred, aka "Alfred Athis"). In 1891, the magazine moved to Paris where it rivaled the Mercure de France, hence its name, which served to mark the difference with the Mercure'''s  purple cover. During the early years the magazine was associated with Marcel Proust.

Thaddeus's wife, Misia, participated in the launch of the magazine and served as a model for some covers. The critics Lucien Muhlfeld and Félix Fénéon from 1896 to 1903 served as secretaries, as well as Léon Blum himself.

The journal served as a representative for the cultural and artistic intelligentsia of the time. Starting from 1898, at the instigation of Lucien Herr, it contributed to the Dreyfus affair, siding with the captain accused of treason. During this period the magazine developed close relations with Emile Durkheim.

Octave Mirbeau published his Diary of a Chambermaid in serial form in the Revue blanche in 1900.

The Revue blanche'' disappeared in 1903 after 237 issues.

References

External links
 La Revue Blanche de Bruxelles, 1889–1891
 La Revue Blanche, 1891–1903

1889 establishments in France
1903 disestablishments in France
Defunct literary magazines published in France
French-language magazines
Magazines established in 1889
Magazines disestablished in 1903
Magazines published in Paris
Mass media in Liège
French art publications